Edna Libby Beutenmüller ( Hyatt; December 8, 1872 – July 14, 1934) was an American scientific illustrator notable for producing illustrations in publications including those published by the American Museum of Natural History. After coming to NY in 1899, she studied art and began working as a botanical illustrator. She was also a collector of specimens and assisted with the scientific study of insect species.

A resident of Tenafly, New Jersey, she was married to William Beutenmuller.

References

   

1872 births
1934 deaths
American women illustrators
American illustrators
Artists from Lincoln, Nebraska
Artists from New Jersey
People from Tenafly, New Jersey